The independence of irrelevant alternatives (IIA), also known as binary independence or the independence axiom, is an axiom of decision theory and various social sciences. The term is used in different connotation in several contexts. Although it always attempts to provide an account of rational individual behavior or aggregation of individual preferences, the exact formulation differs widely in both language and exact content.

Perhaps the easiest way to understand the axiom is how it pertains to casting a ballot. There the axiom says that if Charlie (the irrelevant alternative) enters a race between Alice and Bob, with Alice (leader) liked better than Bob (runner-up), then the individual voter who likes Charlie less than Alice will not switch his vote from Alice to Bob. Because of this, a violation of IIA is commonly referred to as the "spoiler effect": support for Charlie "spoils" the election for Alice, while it "logically" should not have. After all, Alice was liked better than Bob, and Charlie was liked less than Alice.

In collective decision making contexts, the axiom takes a more refined form, and is mathematically intimately tied with Condorcet methods, the Gibbard–Satterthwaite theorem, and the Arrow Impossibility theorem. They all have to do with cyclical majorities between ranked sets, and the related proofs take the same basic form. Behavioral economics has shown the axiom to be commonly violated by humans.

The many forms of IIA

In individual choice theory, IIA sometimes refers to Chernoff's condition or Sen's α (alpha):
if an alternative x is chosen from a set T, and x is also an element of a subset S of T, then x must be chosen from S.  That is, eliminating some of the unchosen alternatives shouldn't affect the selection of x as the best option.

In social choice theory, Arrow's IIA is one of the conditions in Arrow's impossibility theorem, which states that it is impossible to aggregate individual rank-order preferences ("votes") satisfying IIA in addition to certain other reasonable conditions. Arrow defines IIA thus:
The social preferences between alternatives x and y depend only on the individual preferences between x and y.

In social choice theory, IIA is defined as:
If A is selected over B out of the choice set {A,B} by a voting rule for given voter preferences of A, B, and an unavailable third alternative X, then if only preferences for X change, the voting rule must not lead to Bs being selected over A.

In voting theory this often happens because of perverse incentives caused by the voting method. But in fact people violate the axiom for psychological reasons as well.

For example in microeconomics, the axiom is further connected to the theory of revealed preference and formalised instrumental rationality: in neoclassical economics it is generally held to be true, as a basic, predictive part of the framework, and something which theoretically stops Dutch books from happening. However, since it is empirically speaking either unsound or at best a crude approximation of live human behavior, the axiom continues to evoke lively debate. Not the least because it can further be argued that in order for a person to be rational, they should abide by the axiom—thus making the axiom also a matter of moral philosophy and axiology.

Voting theory
In voting systems, independence from irrelevant alternatives is often interpreted as, if one candidate (X) would win an election, and if a new candidate (Y) were added to the ballot, then either X or Y would win the election.

Approval voting, range voting, and majority judgment satisfy the IIA criterion if it is assumed that voters rate candidates individually and independently of knowing the available alternatives in the election, using their own absolute scale. This assumption implies that some voters having meaningful preferences in an election with only two alternatives will necessarily cast a vote which has little or no voting power, or necessarily abstain. If it is assumed to be at least possible that any voter having preferences might not abstain, or vote their favorite and least favorite candidates at the top and bottom ratings respectively, then these systems fail IIA. Allowing either of these conditions alone causes failure. Another cardinal system, cumulative voting, does not satisfy the criterion regardless of either assumption.

An alternative interpretation for the cardinal case is that the ballots themselves pass IIA (i.e. altering the ballot after they have been cast), but not the internal voter preferences (i.e. changing the context in which the ballots were created). Under the assumption of sincerity, the ranked information in ranked ballots and a voter's preference order are the same, so this distinction is not made and both sets of ranked information are assumed to be one and the same. Under the cardinal voting scenario, the context of the election and relative intensity of preferences is what leads to a specific cardinal ballot (and not an absolute scale), and thus, changing the context would change the ballot. Under this interpretation, there is no need for the assumption that voters cast ballots that independently evaluate each candidate on an absolute scale, as the information in the cardinal ballot represents a relative comparative scale. This interpretation is empirically supported by how individuals respond to cardinal comparative evaluations.

An anecdote that illustrates a violation of IIA has been attributed to Sidney Morgenbesser:

After finishing dinner, Sidney Morgenbesser decides to order dessert. The waitress tells him he has two choices: apple pie and blueberry pie. Sidney orders the apple pie. After a few minutes the waitress returns and says that they also have cherry pie at which point Morgenbesser says "In that case I'll have the blueberry pie."

All voting systems have some degree of inherent susceptibility to strategic nomination considerations. Some regard these considerations as less serious unless the voting system fails the easier-to-satisfy independence of clones criterion.

 Local independence 
A criterion weaker than IIA proposed by H. Peyton Young and A. Levenglick is called local independence from irrelevant alternatives (LIIA).
LIIA requires that both of the following conditions always hold:
If the option that finished in last place is deleted from all the votes, then the order of finish of the remaining options must not change. (The winner must not change.)
If the winning option is deleted from all the votes, the order of finish of the remaining options must not change. (The option that finished in second place must become the winner.)

An equivalent way to express LIIA is that if a subset of the options are in consecutive positions in the order of finish, then their relative order of finish must not change if all other options are deleted from the votes. For example, if all options except those in 3rd, 4th and 5th place are deleted, the option that finished 3rd must win, the 4th must finish second, and 5th must finish 3rd.

Another equivalent way to express LIIA is that if two options are consecutive in the order of finish, the one that finished higher must win if all options except those two are deleted from the votes.

LIIA is weaker than IIA because satisfaction of IIA implies satisfaction of LIIA, but not vice versa.

Despite being a weaker criterion (i.e. easier to satisfy) than IIA, LIIA is satisfied by very few voting methods. These include Kemeny-Young and ranked pairs, but not Schulze. Just as with IIA, LIIA compliance for rating methods such as approval voting, range voting, and majority judgment require the assumption that voters rate each alternative individually and independently of knowing any other alternatives, on an absolute scale (calibrated prior to the election), even when this assumption implies that voters having meaningful preferences in a two candidate election will necessarily abstain.

Criticism of IIA
IIA is largely incompatible with the majority criterion unless there are only two alternatives.

Consider a scenario in which there are three candidates A, B, & C, and the voters' preferences are as follows:
25% of the voters prefer A over B, and B over C. (A>B>C)
40% of the voters prefer B over C, and C over A. (B>C>A)
35% of the voters prefer C over A, and A over B. (C>A>B)
(These are preferences, not votes, and thus are independent of the voting method.)

75% prefer C over A, 65% prefer B over C, and 60% prefer A over B. The presence of this societal intransitivity is the voting paradox. Regardless of the voting method and the actual votes, there are only three cases to consider:
Case 1: A is elected. IIA is violated because the 75% who prefer C over A would elect C if B were not a candidate.
Case 2: B is elected. IIA is violated because the 60% who prefer A over B would elect A if C were not a candidate.
Case 3: C is elected. IIA is violated because the 65% who prefer B over C would elect B if A were not a candidate.

To show failure, it is only assumed at least possible that enough voters in the majority might cast a minimally positive vote for their preferred candidate when there are only two candidates, rather than abstain. Most ranked ballot methods and Plurality voting satisfy the Majority Criterion, and therefore fail IIA automatically by the example above. Meanwhile, passage of IIA by Approval and Range voting requires in certain cases that voters in the majority are necessarily excluded from voting (they are assumed to necessarily abstain in a two candidate race, despite having a meaningful preference between the alternatives).

So even if IIA is desirable, requiring its satisfaction seems to allow only voting methods that are undesirable in some other way, such as treating one of the voters as a dictator. Thus the goal must be to find which voting methods are best, rather than which are perfect.

An argument can be made that IIA is itself undesirable. IIA assumes that when deciding whether A is likely to be better than B, information about voters' preferences regarding C is irrelevant and should not make a difference. However, the heuristic that leads to majority rule when there are only two options is that the larger the number of people who think one option is better than the other, the greater the likelihood that it is better, all else being equal (see Condorcet's Jury Theorem). A majority is more likely than the opposing minority to be right about which of the two candidates is better, all else being equal, hence the use of majority rule.

The same heuristic implies that the larger the majority, the more likely it is that they are right. It would seem to also imply that when there is more than one majority, larger majorities are more likely to be right than smaller majorities. Assuming this is so, the 75% who prefer C over A and the 65% who prefer B over C are more likely to be right than the 60% who prefer A over B, and since it is not possible for all three majorities to be right, the smaller majority (who prefer A over B) are more likely to be wrong, and less likely than their opposing minority to be right. Rather than being irrelevant to whether A is better than B, the additional information about the voters' preferences regarding C provides a strong hint that this is a situation where all else is not equal.

In social choice
From Kenneth Arrow, each "voter" i in the society has an ordering Ri that ranks the (conceivable) objects of social choice—x, y, and z in simplest case—from high to low.
An aggregation rule (voting rule) in turn maps each profile or tuple (R1, ...,Rn) of voter preferences (orderings)
to a social ordering R that determines the social preference (ranking) of x, y, and z.

Arrow's IIA requires that whenever a pair of alternatives is ranked the same way in two preference profiles (over the same choice set), then the aggregation rule must order these alternatives identically across the two profiles.
For example, suppose an aggregation rule ranks a above b at the profile given by 
(acbd, dbac),
(i.e., the first individual prefers a first, c second, b third, d last; the second individual prefers d first, ..., and c last). Then, if it satisfies IIA, it must rank a above b at the following three profiles:
(abcd)
(abcd)
(acdb).
The last two forms of profiles (placing the two at the top; and placing the two at the top and bottom) are especially useful
in the proofs of theorems involving IIA.

Arrow's IIA does not imply an IIA similar to those different from this at the top of this article nor conversely.

In the first edition of his book, Arrow misinterpreted IIA by considering the removal of a choice from the consideration set. Among the objects of choice, he distinguished those that by hypothesis are specified as feasible and infeasible. The voting rule generates corresponding social orderings R and R'. Now suppose that X and Y are feasible but Z is infeasible (say, the candidate is not on the ballot or the social state is outside the production possibility curve). Arrow required that the voting rule that R and R' select the same (top-ranked) social choice from the feasible set (X, Y), and that this requirement holds no matter what the ranking is of infeasible Z relative to X and Y in the two sets of orderings. IIA does not allow "removing" an alternative from the available set (a candidate from the ballot), and it says nothing about what would happen in such a case: all options are assumed to be "feasible."

 Examples 

 Borda count 

In a Borda count election, 5 voters rank 5 alternatives [A, B, C, D, E].

3 voters rank [A>B>C>D>E].
1 voter ranks [C>D>E>B>A].
1 voter ranks [E>C>D>B>A].

Borda count (a=0, b=1): C=13, A=12, B=11, D=8, E=6. C wins.

Now, the voter who ranks [C>D>E>B>A] instead ranks [C>B>E>D>A]; and the voter who ranks [E>C>D>B>A] instead ranks [E>C>B>D>A]. They change their preferences only over the pairs [B, D], [B, E] and [D, E].

The new Borda count: B=14, C=13, A=12, E=6, D=5. B wins.

The social choice has changed the ranking of [B, A] and [B, C]. The changes in the social choice ranking are dependent on irrelevant changes in the preference profile. In particular, B now wins instead of C, even though no voter changed their preference over [B, C].

Borda count and strategic voting
Consider an election in which there are three candidates, A, B, and C, and only two voters. Each voter ranks the candidates in order of preference. The highest ranked candidate in a voter's preference is given 2 points, the second highest 1, and the lowest ranked 0; the overall ranking of a candidate is determined by the total score it gets; the highest ranked candidate wins.

Considering two profiles:
In profiles 1 and 2, the first voter casts his votes in the order BAC, so B receives 2 points, A receives 1, and C receives 0 from this voter.
In profile 1, the second voter votes ACB, so A will win outright (the total scores: A 3, B 2, C 1).
In profile 2, the second voter votes ABC, so A and B will tie (the total scores: A 3, B 3, C 0).

Thus, if the second voter wishes A to be elected, he had better vote ACB regardless of his actual opinion of C and B. This violates the idea of "independence from irrelevant alternatives" because the voter's comparative opinion of C and B affects whether A is elected or not. In both profiles, the rankings of A relative to B are the same for each voter, but the social rankings of A relative to B are different.

 Copeland 

This example shows that Copeland's method violates IIA. Assume four candidates A, B, C and D with 6 voters with the following preferences:

The results would be tabulated as follows:

 [X] indicates voters who preferred the candidate in the column caption to the one in the row caption
 [Y] indicates voters who preferred the candidate in the row caption to the one in the column captionResult: A has two wins and one defeat, while no other candidate has more wins than defeats. Thus, A is elected Copeland winner.

 Change of irrelevant preferences 
Now, assume all voters would raise D over B and C without changing the order of A and D. The preferences of the voters would now be:

The results would be tabulated as follows:Result: D wins against all three opponents. Thus, D is elected Copeland winner.

 Conclusion 
The voters changed only their preference orders over B, C and D. As a result, the outcome order of D and A changed. A turned from winner to loser without any change of the voters' preferences regarding A. Thus, Copeland's method fails the IIA criterion.

 Instant-runoff voting 

In an instant-runoff election, 5 voters rank 3 alternatives [A, B, C].

2 voters rank [A>B>C].
2 voters rank [C>B>A].
1 voter ranks [B>A>C].

Round 1: A=2, B=1, C=2; B eliminated.
Round 2: A=3, C=2; A wins.

Now, the two voters who rank [C>B>A] instead rank [B>C>A]. They change only their preferences over B and C.

Round 1: A=2, B=3, C=0; B wins with a majority of the vote.

The social choice ranking of [A, B] is dependent on preferences over the irrelevant alternatives [B, C].

 Kemeny–Young method 

This example shows that the Kemeny–Young method violates the IIA criterion. Assume three candidates A, B and C with 7 voters and the following preferences:

The Kemeny–Young method arranges the pairwise comparison counts in the following tally table:

The ranking scores of all possible rankings are:Result: The ranking A > B > C has the highest ranking score. Thus, A wins ahead of B and C.

 Change of irrelevant preferences 
Now, assume the two voters (marked bold) with preferences B > C > A would change their preferences over the pair B and C. The preferences of the voters would then be in total:

The Kemeny–Young method arranges the pairwise comparison counts in the following tally table:

The ranking scores of all possible rankings are:Result: The ranking C > A > B has the highest ranking score. Thus, C wins ahead of A and B.

 Conclusion 
The two voters changed only their preferences over B and C, but this resulted in a change of the order of A and C in the result, turning A from winner to loser without any change of the voters' preferences regarding A. Thus, the Kemeny-Young method fails the IIA criterion.

 Minimax 

This example shows that the Minimax method violates the IIA criterion. Assume four candidates A, B and C and 13 voters with the following preferences:

Since all preferences are strict rankings (no equals are present), all three Minimax methods (winning votes, margins and pairwise opposite) elect the same winners.

The results would be tabulated as follows:

 [X] indicates voters who preferred the candidate in the column caption to the one in the row caption
 [Y] indicates voters who preferred the candidate in the row caption to the one in the column captionResult: A has the closest biggest defeat. Thus, A is elected Minimax winner.

 Change of irrelevant preferences 
Now, assume the two voters (marked bold) with preferences B > A > C change the preferences over the pair A and C. The preferences of the voters would then be in total:

The results would be tabulated as follows:Result: Now, B has the closest biggest defeat. Thus, B''' is elected Minimax winner.

 Conclusion 
So, by changing the order of A and C in the preferences of some voters, the order of A and B in the result changed. B is turned from loser to winner without any change of the voters' preferences regarding B. Thus, the Minimax method fails the IIA criterion.

 Plurality voting system 

In a plurality voting system 7 voters rank 3 alternatives (A, B, C).

3 voters rank (A>B>C)
2 voters rank (B>A>C)
2 voters rank (C>B>A)

In an election, initially only A and B run: B wins with 4 votes to As 3, but the entry of C into the race makes A the new winner.

The relative positions of A and B are reversed by the introduction of C, an "irrelevant" alternative.

 Ranked pairs 

This example shows that the Ranked pairs method violates the IIA criterion. Assume three candidates A, B and C and 7 voters with the following preferences:

The results would be tabulated as follows:

The sorted list of victories would be:Result: A > B and B > C are locked in (and C > A cannot be locked in after that), so the full ranking is A > B > C. Thus, A is elected Ranked pairs winner.

 Change of irrelevant preferences 
Now, assume the two voters (marked bold) with preferences B > C > A change their preferences over the pair B and C. The preferences of the voters would then be in total:

The results would be tabulated as follows:

The sorted list of victories would be:Result: All three duels are locked in, so the full ranking is C > A > B. Thus, the Condorcet winner C is elected Ranked pairs winner.

 Conclusion 
So, by changing their preferences over B and C, the two voters changed the order of A and C in the result, turning A from winner to loser without any change of the voters' preferences regarding A. Thus, the Ranked pairs method fails the IIA criterion.

 Schulze method 

This example shows that the Schulze method violates the IIA criterion. Assume four candidates A, B, C and D and 12 voters with the following preferences:

The pairwise preferences would be tabulated as follows:

Now, the strongest paths have to be identified, e.g. the path D > A > B is stronger than the direct path D > B (which is nullified, since it is a tie).Result: The full ranking is C > D > A > B. Thus, C is elected Schulze winner and D is preferred over A.

 Change of irrelevant preferences 
Now, assume the two voters (marked bold) with preferences C > B > D > A change their preferences over the pair B and C. The preferences of the voters would then be in total:

Hence, the pairwise preferences would be tabulated as follows:

Now, the strongest paths have to be identified:Result: Now, the full ranking is A > B > C > D. Thus, A' is elected Schulze winner and is preferred over D.

 Conclusion 
So, by changing their preferences over B and C, the two voters changed the order of A and D in the result, turning A from loser to winner without any change of the voters' preferences regarding A. Thus, the Schulze method fails the IIA criterion.

 Two-round system 

A probable example of the two-round system failing this criterion was the 2002 French presidential election. Polls leading up to the election have suggested a runoff between centre-right candidate Jacques Chirac and centre-left candidate Lionel Jospin, in which Jospin has been expected to win. However, the first round was contested by an unprecedented 16 candidates, including left-wing candidates who intended to support Jospin in the runoff, eventually resulting in the far-right candidate, Jean-Marie Le Pen, finishing second and entering the runoff instead of Jospin, which Chirac won by a large margin. Thus, the presence of many candidates who did not intend to win in the election changed which of the candidates won.

Criticisms of the IIA assumption

IIA implies that adding another option or changing the characteristics of a third option does not affect the relative odds between the two options considered. This implication is not realistic for applications with similar options. 
 
Consider the Red Bus/Blue Bus example, due to Daniel McFadden.  Commuter John Doe faces a decision between taking a car or a red bus. Suppose  he chooses between these two options with equal probability on a given day (because of weather or whim). The odds ratio between car and red bus then equals 1:1. Now  add a third alternative: blue bus. If Doe does not care about bus color, we would expect the probability of car to remain .5, while the probability of each of the two bus types  would be 0.25. But IIA rules that out. It says that the new choice must not change the odds ratio  of 1:1 between car and red bus. Since Doe's indifference to color requires the odds of  red and blue bus to be equal, the new probabilities must be: car 0.33, red bus 0.33, blue bus 0.33. The overall probability of car travel has fallen from .5 to .33, which is absurd. The problem with the IIA axiom is that it takes no account of the fact that red bus and blue bus are perfect substitutes. 

The failure of this assumption has also been observed in practice, for example in the opinion polling for the 2019 European Elections held in the United Kingdom.  In one survey, 21% of potential voters expressed support for the Labour Party under the scenario where there were three smaller Anti-Brexit parties to choose from, but under a scenario where two of those three parties did not stand candidates, the support for Labour dropped to 18%.  This means at least 3% of potential voters stopped supporting their preferred party when a less preferred party dropped out.

In econometrics
IIA is a direct consequence of the assumptions underlying the multinomial logit and the conditional logit models in econometrics. If these models are used in situations which in fact violate independence (such as multicandidate elections in which preferences exhibit cycling or situations mimicking the Red Bus/Blue Bus example given above) then these estimators become invalid.

Many modeling advances have been motivated by a desire to alleviate the concerns raised by IIA. Generalized extreme value, multinomial probit (also called conditional probit) and mixed logit are models for nominal outcomes that relax IIA, but they often have assumptions of their own that may be difficult to meet or are computationally infeasible. IIA can be relaxed by specifying a hierarchical model, ranking the choice alternatives. The most popular of these is the nested logit model.

Generalized extreme value and multinomial probit models possess another property, the Invariant Proportion of Substitution, which suggests similarly counterintuitive individual choice behavior.

Choice under uncertainty
In the expected utility theory of von Neumann and Morgenstern, four axioms together imply that individuals act in situations of risk as if they maximize the expected value of a utility function. One of the axioms is an independence axiom analogous to the IIA axiom:

where p is a probability, pL+(1-p)N means a gamble with probability p of yielding L and probability (1-p) of yielding N, and  means that M is preferred over L. This axiom says that if one outcome (or lottery ticket) L is considered to be not as good as another (M), then having a chance with probability p of receiving L rather than N is considered to be not as good as having a chance with probability p of receiving M rather than N''.

In nature
Natural selection can favor animals' non-IIA-type choices, thought to be due to occasional availability of foodstuffs, according to a study published in January 2014.

See also
Independence of Smith-dominated alternatives
Luce's choice axiom
Sure-thing principle
Menu dependence
 Decoy effect
 Predictably Irrational#The Truth about Relativity

Footnotes

References
 

 Discusses and deduces the not always recognized differences between various formulations of IIA.

Further reading
 

Electoral system criteria
Econometric modeling
Social choice theory